The hate speech laws in Australia give redress to someone who is the victim of discrimination, vilification, or injury on grounds that differ from one jurisdiction to another. All Australian jurisdictions give redress when a person is victimised on account of colour, ethnicity, national origin, or race. Some jurisdictions give redress when a person is victimised on account of colour, ethnic origin, religion, disability, gender identity, HIV/AIDS status or sexual orientation.

Federal

The Racial Discrimination Act 1975 forbids hate speech on several grounds. The Act makes it "unlawful for a person to do an act, otherwise than in private, if the act is reasonably likely, in all the circumstances, to offend, insult, humiliate or intimidate another person or a group of people; and the act is done because of the race, colour or national or ethnic origin of the other person, or of some or all of the people in the group."
An aggrieved person can lodge a complaint with the Australian Human Rights Commission. If the complaint is validated, the Commission will attempt to conciliate the matter. If the Commission cannot negotiate an agreement which is acceptable to the complainant, the complainant's only redress is through the Federal Court or through the Federal Circuit Court.

In 2002, the Federal Court applied the Act in the case of Jones v Toben. The case involved a complaint about a website which contained material that denied the Holocaust. The Federal Court ruled that the material was a violation of the Act.
 
Section 474.17 of the Criminal Code makes it an offence to use a carriage service such as the Internet in a manner which reasonable persons would regard as menacing, harassing or offensive. Federal criminal law, therefore, is available to address racial vilification where the element of threat or harassment is also present, although it does not apply to material that is merely offensive.

Australian Capital Territory
The Discrimination Act 1991 is similar to the law in New South Wales.

In 2016 the law was amended to include a proscription of actions inciting hatred toward, revulsion of, serious contempt for, or severe ridicule of a person or group of people on the ground of any of the following(a) disability; (b) gender identity; (c) HIV/AIDS status; (d) race; (e) religious conviction; (f) sexuality. Prior to the passage of these amendments, religion in particular was not included.

New South Wales 

In June 2018, both houses of the Parliament of New South Wales unanimously passed and the Governor of New South Wales signed an urgent bill without amendments called the Crimes Amendment (Publicly Threatening and Inciting Violence) Bill 2018 to repeal the vilification laws within the Anti-Discrimination Act 1977 and replace it with criminal legislation with up to an explicit 3 year term of imprisonment within this Act. The legislation went into effect on August 13, 2018 - by proclamation on August 10, 2018.

Back in 1989, by an amendment to the Anti-Discrimination Act 1977, New South Wales became the first state to make it unlawful for a person, by a public act, to incite hatred towards, serious contempt for, or severe ridicule of a person or group on the grounds of race. The amendment also created a criminal offence for inciting hatred, contempt or severe ridicule towards a person or group on the grounds of race by threatening physical harm (towards people or their property) or inciting others to threaten such harm. Prosecution of the offence of serious vilification requires consent from the Attorney General of New South Wales and carries a maximum penalty of a $10,000 fine or 6 months imprisonment for an individual—$100,000 for a corporation. An offence has not yet been prosecuted under this law. As of 1994, the Anti-Discrimination Act 1977 has had various setbacks in its process to handle complaints such as complaints not being proceeded with due to the lack of evidence in cases and those pursuing the act of discrimination losing interest in their own complaint. Further, due to the nature of discrimination reports in NSW, the Board receives multiple complaints stemming from a single act of vilification and therefore is required to address each complaint separately, which can create dissonance between the resolutions desired by each individual or group.

Northern Territory
The Anti-Discrimination Act 1992 prohibits discrimination and harassment in activities associated with education, work, accommodation, services, clubs, and insurance or superannuation.

Queensland
Queensland's Anti-Discrimination Act 1991 and amendments create laws that are similar to Tasmania's.
In 2001, the Islamic Council of Queensland brought the first action under the Anti-Discrimination Act for victimisation on account of religion. The Islamic Council complained that the respondent Mr. Lamb, a candidate in a federal election, had expressed some unfavourable opinions about Muslims in an electioneering pamphlet. Walter Sofronoff, for the Anti-Discrimination Tribunal, dismissed the action on the ground that Mr. Lamb did not intend to incite hatred or contempt but rather wanted to let the electors know his opinions on political matters.

South Australia
The Racial Vilification Act 1996 is similar to the law in New South Wales. In 2002, the Attorney-General's Department released a discussion paper entitled 'Proposal for a new law against religious discrimination and vilification.' Following many objections, no legislation was enacted.

Tasmania
The Anti-Discrimination Act 1998 prohibits "any conduct which offends, humiliates, intimidates, insults or ridicules another person" on the basis of attributes including race, sexual orientation, religion, gender identity and disability.

Section 19 of Tasmania's Anti-Discrimination Act 1998 prohibits anyone from inciting hatred. The Act says: 
A person, by a public act, must not incite hatred towards, serious contempt for, or severe ridicule of, a person or a group of persons on the ground of –
(a) the race of the person or any member of the group; or
(b) any disability of the person or any member of the group; or
(c) the sexual orientation or lawful sexual activity of the person or any member of the group; or
(d) the religious belief or affiliation or religious activity of the person or any member of the group.

Victoria

The Racial and Religious Tolerance Act 2001 makes behavior that incites or encourages hatred, serious contempt, revulsion or severe ridicule against another person or group of people, because of their race or religion, unlawful in Victoria. The Act went into effect on 1 January 2002. The Act also prohibits racist graffiti, racist posters, racist stickers, racist comments made in a publication, including the Internet and email, statements at a meeting or at a public rally. The Act explicitly applies to public behavior, not personal beliefs.

Western Australia
Unlike other jurisdictions, Western Australian law imposes criminal but not civil sanctions against racial vilification. In Western Australia, the Criminal Code was amended in 1989 to criminalise the possession, publication and display of written or pictorial material that is threatening or abusive with the intention of inciting racial hatred or of harassing a racial group. Penalties range between 6 months and two years imprisonment. The Western Australian legislation only addresses written or pictorial information—not verbal comments. The emphasis on written material arose in direct response to the racist poster campaigns of the Australian Nationalist Movement in the late 1980s and early 1990s. In 2004 the Criminal Code Amendment (Racial Vilification) Act 2004 was passed, making racial vilification punishable by 14 years imprisonment.

References 

Law of Australia
Hate speech
Censorship in Australia